KLIX-FM (96.5 MHz) is a commercial radio station located in Twin Falls, Idaho.  KLIX-FM airs a classic hits music format branded as "Kool 96.5".

Ownership
In October 2007, a deal was reached for KLIX-FM to be acquired by GAP Broadcasting II LLC (Samuel Weller, president) from Clear Channel Communications as part of a 57 station deal with a total reported sale price of $74.78 million.  What eventually became GapWest Broadcasting was folded into Townsquare Media on August 13, 2010.

References

External links
Official Website
Flash Stream
MP3 Stream

LIX-FM
Classic hits radio stations in the United States
Townsquare Media radio stations